Aberdeenshire was a Scottish county constituency of the House of Commons of the Parliament of Great Britain from 1708 to 1800 and of the House of Commons of the Parliament of the United Kingdom from 1801 until 1868.

In 1868 it was divided to create Eastern Aberdeenshire and Western Aberdeenshire.

Creation
The British parliamentary constituency was created in 1708 following the Acts of Union 1707 and replaced the former Parliament of Scotland shire constituency of Aberdeenshire .

Boundaries 

When created in 1708, the constituency covered the county of Aberdeen minus the burgh of Aberdeen, which was part of the Aberdeen Burghs constituency.

Under the Representation of the People (Scotland) Act 1832 the Aberdeen burgh constituency was created to cover the burgh plus areas previously within the Aberdeenshire constituency.

History
The constituency elected one Member of Parliament (MP) by the first past the post system until the seat was abolished for the 1868 general election.

In 1868, the Representation of the People (Scotland) Act 1868 divided Aberdeenshire to form Eastern Aberdeenshire and Western Aberdeenshire, and these new constituencies were first used in the 1868 general election.

Members of Parliament

Election results

Elections in the 1830s

Elections in the 1840s

Gordon was appointed a Lord Commissioner of the Admiralty, requiring a by-election.

Elections in the 1850s

Gordon resigned by accepting the office of Steward of the Chiltern Hundreds, causing a by-election.

Elections in the 1860s
Hamilton-Gordon succeeded as 5th Earl of Aberdeen, causing a by-election.

Leslie resigned, causing a by-election.

See also 
 Former United Kingdom Parliament constituencies

References 

Historic parliamentary constituencies in Scotland (Westminster)
Constituencies of the Parliament of the United Kingdom established in 1708
Constituencies of the Parliament of the United Kingdom disestablished in 1868
Politics of the county of Aberdeen
History of Aberdeenshire